CB Hounslow United Football Club is a football club based in Hounslow, Greater London, England.

History
The club was formed in 1989 after Richmond Rangers disbanded, and were named after Cater Bank, a company owned by the father of the club chairman and also the club's sponsors. They initially played in the Hounslow & District League, before joining the Senior Division of the Middlesex County League in 1997. After finishing fourth in 1998–99, the club were promoted to the Premier Division. They were runners-up in 2004–05 and again in 2005–06, after which they successfully applied for promotion to Division One of the Combined Counties League.

In 2015–16 the club won Division One, earning promotion to the Premier Division.

Ground
The club originally played at the Osterley Sports Club, before starting to groundshare at Bedfont & Feltham's Orchard ground in 2013–14 while a new ground at Green Lane was being built at a cost of £1.5 million. The site had previously been five unused football pitches and was replaced by a ground including a seated stand on one side of the pitch, a covered area behind one goal and a clubhouse. The first match at the new ground was an FA Cup extra-preliminary round tie against Rusthall on 8 August 2017 with the home team winning 2–1.

Honours
Combined Counties League
Division One champions 2015–16

Records
Best FA Cup performance: First qualifying round, 2016–17
Best FA Vase performance: Second qualifying round, 2015–16, 2016–17

References

External links
Official website

Football clubs in England
Football clubs in London
Association football clubs established in 1989
1989 establishments in England
Middlesex County Football League
Combined Counties Football League
Sport in the London Borough of Hounslow